Sant Feliu Sasserra is a municipality in the extreme north-east of the comarca of Bages, in Catalonia. It is also within the natural comarca of Lluçanès.

The municipality's name has its origins in several features of the town. It is named Sant Feliu after a primitive church erected atop a rock named the roca d'en Feliu, or "Felix's Rock". The main road through the municipality, which connected Prats de Lluçanès with Artés in Bages, followed the area's hilly natural contours along a ridge, hence Sasserra.

The municipality surrounds an exclave of Oristà.

Although the municipality lies within the natural region of Lluçanès, it voted in 2015 not to join a proposed new comarca of that name, but the plan was put on hold due to insufficient support.

Sites of interest

 The Casa del Consell, in the Gothic style, former seat of the sotsvegueria of Lluçanès.
 The Church of Sant Feliu, in the Gothic style, with a Romanesque vestibule.

Demography

References

External links

Town website 
 Government data pages 

Municipalities in Bages
Populated places in Bages